Maimuna "Muna" Otaru is a Liverpool-born British actress known for her role as Mad in the film The Keeping Room.

Filmography

Film

Television

References

External links

English television actresses
Black British actresses
English film actresses
21st-century British actresses
1978 births
Actresses from Liverpool
Living people
21st-century English women
21st-century English people